Kameničky is a municipality and village in Chrudim District in the Pardubice Region of the Czech Republic. It has about 800 inhabitants.

Administrative parts
The village of Filipov is an administrative part of Kameničky.

Geography
It lies in the Iron Mountains, in the Žďárské vrchy Protected Landscape Area. It is situated on the Chrudimka River near its spring.

History
The first written mention of Kameničky is from 1350, when a parish church is documented here. The village of Filipov was founded in the late 18th century.

Sights

The main sight is the Baroque Church of the Holy Trinity. It was built in 1764–1766, when it replaced an old wooden church. The complex around the church contains a monument to World War I victims and valuable statues of St. John of Nepomuk from 1723 and St. Florian from 1779.

In art
In the early 20th century, after Karel Václav Rais published the book Západ about this area, painter Antonín Slavíček often visited Kameničky and lived here for three years. He created about 70 paintings here, including one of his most famous works At Home in Kameničky. Many other artists visited him in the village. Today, the municipality periodically operates art exhibitions and maintains a Slavíček gallery.

References

External links

Villages in Chrudim District